Henry Nevil Payne (died 1710?) was a dramatist and agitator for the Roman Catholic cause in Scotland and England. He wrote The Fatal Jealousy (1672), The Morning Ramble (1672), and The Siege of Constantinople (1675). After he finished writing plays, he was heavily involved in the Montgomery Plot in 1689, and was captured and put to torture on 10 December 1690.  He was finally released in February 1701, and commenced further plotting. His fate is unknown; Montague Summers's The Works of Aphra Behn suggests 1710 for his death date, but offers no cite.

References
Paul Hopkins, ‘Payne, Henry (d. 1705?)’, Oxford Dictionary of National Biography, Oxford University Press, September 2004; online edn, January 2007
The Fatal Jealousie (1673), by Henry Nevil Payne, edited by Willard Thorp. The Augustan Reprint Society (1948).

External links
 

17th-century births
1710 deaths
Year of birth unknown
Year of death unknown
Torture in the United Kingdom
British dramatists and playwrights
British activists
British male dramatists and playwrights